Mapinguari is a genus of mydas flies in the family Mydidae, found in Brazil. There are two described species in Mapinguari.

Species
These two species belong to the genus Mapinguari:
 Mapinguari polita (Wiedemann, 1828)
 Mapinguari uai

References

Mydidae
Asiloidea genera